"Ante Up (Robbin-Hoodz Theory)" (also simply known as "Ante Up") is a song by American hip hop duo M.O.P. from their fourth studio album Warriorz (2000). Seen as their breakthrough single, it was released in 2000 and reached number 7 on the UK Singles Chart. A remix of the song features Busta Rhymes, Remy Martin and Teflon. The remix CD includes an additional version which features Funkmaster Flex.

Background and composition
In an interview with Zilla Rocca at Passion of Weiss, "It's a saying that we got from my mother, every time someone comes through the door she’s like, 'Where it's at? Ante up.' Just the fact that we took it from the street corner—there was two meaning to the record. It was ante up, we've been in this game too long you guys see how we demolish the stage, how we make short work of the main major artists when we get on their records and you still won't give us the props and the recognition that we deserve."

The song is based around a sample from the Sam & Dave song "Soul Sister, Brown Sugar".

Music video
The music video for the song was directed by Little X. It features M.O.P. performing the song at Herbert Von King Park in Bedford-Stuyvesant Brooklyn, on stage. It features cameo appearances from Gang Starr, Lord Have Mercy, Easy Mo Bee, Ralph McDaniels, DJ Green Lantern, Buckshot of Black Moon, Steele of Smif-N-Wessun, Method Man, Afu-Ra, and Tony Touch.

Usage in media
"Ante Up" was featured in several films within years of its release, such as The Last Castle, Brown Sugar, Dickie Roberts: Former Child Star, the dance film You Got Served, 30 Minutes or Less and A Simple Favor. The song was also featured in an episode of the short lived television series Robbery Homicide Division, as well as an episode of Brooklyn Nine-Nine ("The Chopper") and an episode of The Mindy Project ("In the Club") and Superstore in the fourth episode ("mannequin")

In 2003, the song was sampled by Javine Hylton for her debut single "Real Things". However, it gained mainstream attention after being sampled by John Cena in the song "The Time Is Now". M.O.P. eventually sued, but later dropped legal proceedings for the alleged unlawful sampling.

The guitar version of the song can be heard in the video game Midnight Club 3: Dub Edition.

In 2014, it was used for an advert for O2 Bundles in the UK, and is used in British TV show Soccer AM in a segment entitled "that's obscene, that is".

In 2017, YouTuber and member of the Sidemen, W2S, sampled the song for his KSI diss track KSI Sucks, which, as of January 2023, has over 70 million views on YouTube. In 2018, W2S sampled the song again for his RiceGum diss track, entitled Ricegum Sucks. This has, as of January 2023, over 30 million views on YouTube.

In 2017, the song was featured in the trailer of the game Tekken 7.

In 2017, the song is also heard in the movie Bodied.

In the 2018 movie A Simple Favor, Stephanie Smothers (Anna Kendrick) is seen rapping this song in her car.

In 2021, KFC used the song in a UK advertisement for their Big Deal.

Charts

Weekly charts

Year-end charts

Certifications

References

2000 songs
2000 singles
M.O.P. songs